Lois & Clark: The New Adventures of Superman is an American superhero television series based on the DC Comics character Superman created by Jerry Siegel and Joe Shuster. It stars Dean Cain as Clark Kent / Superman and Teri Hatcher as Lois Lane. The series aired on ABC from September 12, 1993, to June 14, 1997.

Developed for television by Deborah Joy LeVine, the series loosely followed the modern origin of Superman, established by writer John Byrne, in which Clark Kent is the true personality and Superman a disguise. The series focuses on the relationship and romance between Lois and Clark as much as the adventures of Clark's alter-ego, Superman.

Overview
On May 17, 1966, Jonathan and Martha Kent (Eddie Jones and K. Callan) witness the crash-landing of a small spaceship in Shuster's Field outside of Smallville, Kansas. When they investigate, they discover the baby Kal-El and decide to raise him as their own, naming him Clark Jerome Kent (Dean Cain). Throughout the series, Clark proudly states his mother made his Superman costume for him. Clark often consults his parents either by telephone or in person, after impromptu Superman flights to Smallville, to talk about personal concerns and moral dilemmas.

The series opens twenty-seven years later, on the day Clark moves to Metropolis after leaving his position as a newspaper editor of Smallville Press and interviews for a job at the Daily Planet under editor Perry White (Lane Smith). Clark becomes acquainted with photographer Jimmy Olsen (Michael Landes in season 1, Justin Whalin thereafter) and gossip columnist Cat Grant (Tracy Scoggins). Soon after being hired, Clark is partnered with star reporter Lois Lane (Teri Hatcher). Clark falls in love with Lois at first sight. When Superman saves Lois from a space shuttle disaster, she instantly becomes infatuated with Clark's alter-ego, and names him Superman.

Superman's first mission interferes with the illegal dealings of Lex Luthor (John Shea), a Metropolis business giant and benefactor. After Luthor's plot was stopped, Superman lets Luthor know he is watching him and the two become arch-enemies. However, Clark respects Luthor's life, even surreptitiously using his superpowers to save Lex from bleeding to death. Luthor sees Superman as a worthy opponent; he ultimately discovers his weakness to kryptonite and realizes he has a secret identity, vowing to learn it in hopes of making the hero's life difficult.

Production

DC Comics president Jenette Kahn had been working for several years to sell the concept of a Superman television series. The series would be different. In 1991 Leslie Moonves and Deborah Joy LeVine helped sell the series to ABC television network with a new title, Lois and Clark: The New Adventures of Superman.

The series mirrored John Byrne's reboot of Superman, making Clark Kent more assertive and less clumsy. A few episodes directly emphasized that Clark was the unequivocal dominant personality, not Superman. Following this theme, an innovation unique to the series was the depiction of Clark Kent and Superman's traditional hairstyles being reversed—in this series, it is Superman whose hair is slicked back and Clark whose fringe falls more naturally. An additional element that reflected the post-Byrne comics was the portrayal of Lex Luthor (at least initially) as a corrupt corporate tycoon rather than the traditional mad scientist.  Perry White was portrayed as a consummate Elvis Presley fan.

Many of the stories in season one involved normal human criminals using advanced and powerful technology or involved in large and dangerous conspiracies—most, if not all, of the Lex Luthor stories of season one. After season one, series creator Deborah Joy LeVine left the show as a producer, and a new production team took over the series. Episode plots gradually shifted from those in which Lois, Clark, and Superman only became involved with criminal elements or dangerous situations through their own initiative to more fantastic plots. The show often centered on comic-style villains who specifically targeted Lois, Superman, or Clark from the beginning, rather than endangering the protagonists reactively when they became threats to other criminal plans. Later plots frequently revolved around villains with special superhuman powers and abilities.

A fifth season of the series was initially announced by ABC. When the network unexpectedly canceled plans for season five, the producers and writers of the show were unprepared. The series ended on a cliffhanger in which Clark and Lois find an infant in their home with a note saying the child belongs to them. This mystery was never solved on the series.

Series history

Season 1 (1993–1994)

Teri Hatcher and Dean Cain received critical praise for their performances. Lane Smith breathed life and humor into the Daily Planet editor-in-chief Perry White and John Shea received positive reviews for his portrayal of Lex Luthor. Michael Landes portrayed a modern-day Jimmy Olsen and Tracy Scoggins a comedic portrayal of Cat Grant. Lex Luthor's death in the season finale occurred after disagreements between Shea and the producers over the actor's strenuous commute between New York and Los Angeles. No longer a regular cast member, he reappeared once in season two, twice in season three, and once in season four.

Luthor develops an interest in Lois Lane and through most of the first season tries to woo her. Although Lois is receptive to his romantic advances, she remains infatuated with Superman. Lois also develops feelings for Clark, but represses or denies them. Luthor eventually proposes marriage to Lois. Clark, seeing he may lose Lois, attempts to convince her of Luthor's true nature, but fails. In a last-ditch attempt, Clark tells Lois that he is in love with her; she replies that she does not return his feelings but cares for him deeply as a friend. Later, Lois asks Superman if there is any chance of a romance between the two of them. Superman turns her down and Lois accepts Luthor's proposal. Luthor decides to coincide his nuptials with the death of Superman, whom he traps in a kryptonite cage in the wine cellar of Luthor Tower, which also contains the chapel where the wedding will occur. As the wedding approaches, Lois realizes she loves Clark and says no to Lex at the altar.

Clark had been working with Perry and Jimmy to expose Lex and they have enough evidence for the police to interrupt the wedding. Lex eludes the police and jumps from his penthouse office to his apparent death. Superman has escaped the cage and, as Clark, rejoins Lois. However, his powers have been diminished by kryptonite and he cannot stop the villain from falling to the pavement. Newspapers report that Lex's body has been stolen from the morgue and hint he may not be dead. Clark, fearing his unrequited love for Lois may damage their relationship, tells her his profession of love was only out of a desire to protect her from Lex. Lois, who was about to tell Clark that she loves him too, instead keeps it to herself and their relationship remains a friendship.

Season 2 (1994–1995)
In season two, the character of Cat Grant was dropped, and Michael Landes was replaced with Justin Whalin as Jimmy Olsen. The official reason, according to Landes, was that he looked too similar to Dean Cain. On the show, the explanation is that he has changed with age. Series creator Deborah Joy LeVine and the entire first-season writing team were also dismissed. The new producer, Robert Singer, planned a stronger focus on action; the show also shifted its focus onto the budding romance between Lois and Clark.

Lex Luthor returned in one episode and other villains from the comics, such as The Prankster, Metallo, the Toyman and the criminal group known as Intergang, began to appear. This season also featured the debut of fan-favorite villain Tempus (Lane Davies) and H. G. Wells appeared as a time-traveler. Wells's younger self was played by Terry Kiser, and the older Wells was played by Hamilton Camp.

During the season, Clark and Lois begin to consider dating but are interrupted by Mayson Drake (Farrah Forke), a district attorney who takes a romantic interest in Clark but has a total lack of regard for Superman. Mayson dies as Lois and Clark have their first date. In the next episode, a federal agent named Dan Scardino (Jim Pirri) becomes a rival to Clark for Lois' affections. After initially spurning Dan, Lois decides to date Dan when Clark frequently has to suddenly leave their talks or get-togethers to save other people (as Superman) but offers ridiculous reasons for why he had to suddenly depart. Lois eventually decides she has more feelings for Clark than for Dan, and they begin dating more seriously. In the season finale, Clark comes close to telling Lois his secret but does not, first because of his uncertainty about her reaction, and then interruptions by people plotting to expose his identity to the world. At the end of the final episode, Clark proposes to Lois but Lois' response is left as a cliffhanger for the next season. Season two became a success and garnered higher ratings in its initial airings, ending the season in 58th place.

Season 3 (1995–1996)
Season three averaged more than 18 million viewers per episode and ranked 44th for the season. In the premiere episode, Lois responds to Clark's marriage proposal by revealing that she knows Clark's secret identity, and she expresses concern about how she can trust him when he's kept that secret from her for so long. After they separate for a time, Lois dates Patrick Sullivan, an antique dealer who is plotting to kill her in a sacrificial druid ritual. She and Clark carry out assignments where they either pose as a married couple or are alone together for an entire weekend, and they resolve their disagreements.

Lois finally accepts Clark's engagement ring in the seventh episode, "Ultra Woman". ABC announced that the wedding would occur on Valentine's Day weekend; with ABC sending heart-shaped "wedding invitations" to ABC News staff. A controversy erupted when ABC presented the viewers with a bogus wedding, with Clark unwittingly married to a clone of Lois. This was the start of a five-part story, in which Lois is kidnapped by Lex Luthor and replaced by a clone. During the story, Clark tries to find the real Lois, who is suffering from amnesia. Once she recovers, Lois and Clark are still engaged when two other Kryptonians come to Earth, one of whom claims to be Clark's wife. They insist Clark go with them to save their world, New Krypton, from domination by an evil tyrant named Lord Nor; Clark leaves Lois, taking her wedding ring to remember her and as a promise to return as quickly as possible. While committed to each other, they both doubt he will ever return.

Season 4 (1996–1997)

The final season had several two-part episodes. It began with the resolution of a cliffhanger involving a previously unknown colony of Kryptonians. Lois and Clark finally wed in the third episode of the season entitled
"Swear To God, This Time We're Not Kidding". The same week, DC Comics released Superman: The Wedding Album, featuring the long-awaited marriage of Lois and Clark. The series ended on a cliffhanger in which Lois and Clark find an infant in Clark's old bassinet, along with a note that claimed the child belonged to them.

During the fourth season, ABC had announced a fifth season of the show; its producers and writers were unprepared when ABC later decided that no new episodes would be produced. The series had weakened in its Sunday 8:00 pm timeslot and had been shifted to 7:00 pm in January, and was moved to Saturdays in the spring. The ratings dropped even further, and the show finished its last season in 104th place, averaging less than 10 million viewers per episode. It was removed from the schedule in May 1997. ABC made up for its commitment to Warner Bros. by ordering thirteen episodes of a Debra Messing drama, Prey.

The fourth season starts with Clark heading toward New Krypton, while the evil tyrant Nor has instead invaded Earth, so Clark returns just  as Nor takes over Smallville. He and Lois defeat the tyrant and persuade the New Kryptonians to allow Clark to stay on Earth. After another failed wedding ceremony, Lois and Clark get married. Evil forces continue to assault them, delaying their honeymoon, but eventually, the couple moves into a new home.  Throughout the season they strengthen their bond, despite some disagreements and villains trying to destroy them. The newlywed reporters discover that Clark cannot father a child with Lois, but at the end of the last episode, a child mysteriously appears. This mystery was never resolved in the television series, but Brad Buckner, executive producer, and writer for the third and fourth seasons, later revealed the planned story was that the child "was Kryptonian royalty, stashed by his mother to keep him safe from assassins".

Cast

Main cast

Recurring

Special guest

Novels, collected editions and related merchandise
Lois & Clark: A Superman Novel by author C. J. Cherryh, based on the television series, was released in 1996. The novel was published in a Science Fiction Book Club hardcover edition and a paperback edition by Prima Publishing.

Other novels based on the series include:
Lois & Clark: The New Adventures of Superman: Heat Wave
 Lois & Clark: The New Adventures of Superman: Exile
Lois & Clark: The New Adventures of Superman: Deadly Games

DC Comics published a comic book trade paperback collected edition Lois & Clark, The New Adventures of Superman, in 1994, which featured a selection of modern era stories by John Byrne and other writers and artists. The collection includes an introduction by Byrne, with the show's star Dean Cain and Teri Hatcher as Lois and Clark on the cover.
Lois & Clark, The New Adventures of Superman – collects The Man of Steel #2, Superman Annual vol. 2 #1, Superman vol. 2 #9 and 11, Action Comics #600 and 655, Adventures of Superman #445, 462, and 466. (192 pages)

Skybox released in 1995 a series of trading cards based on the first season of the show. 90 trading cards were issued alongside 9 special cards, a series of temporary tattoos and two illustrated cards by well known artists Boris Vallejo and Julie Bell.

Broadcasts

United States

From September 1997 to August 2003 all four seasons of the show were aired on TNT television network. The entire series became available on HBO Max in August 2021.

United Kingdom
The series premiered on BBC One on Saturday, January 8, 1994, with repeat showings until 2002. During its run on BBC One, the series was retitled "The New Adventures of Superman". The BBC held the rights to premiere the first three seasons. It also aired on CBBC's Saturday Aardvark strand (later known as Planet Saturday) at 8:30 am. BBC Two has also repeated the series at tea times alongside The Simpsons, The Fresh Prince of Bel-Air and many others. Sky One held the premiere rights to the fourth season in 1997 and broadcast the show under the original full title. The BBC broadcast the episodes a few weeks later. Sky One broadcast seasons one, two and three just before the premiere of season four in early 1997. UK Gold, Sky Living, Bravo, Channel One and ITV2 have also repeated the series. BBC2 last repeated season one in late 2005. Satellite channel Syfy repeated the first two seasons and the first half of season three in 2012, before replacing it with Smallville.

Republic of Ireland
The series aired on RTÉ One from 1995 to 1998 and regularly rerun on TG4 from 2000 to 2002.

Home media
Warner Home Video has released all four seasons of Lois & Clark: The New Adventures of Superman on DVD in Regions 1, 2, and 4.

Soundtrack

 Mastered at Capitol Records, Hollywood
 Digital editing, pre-mastering: Bruno Coon
 Engineers:
 Greg Townley (all orchestral recording)
 Michael Eric Hutchinson
 Bobby Fernandez  ("Main Title Theme"  recording & mixing)
 Ray Pyle ("Main Title Theme extended mix"  recording & mixing)
 Art Direction: Doerte Lau
 Design: Andreas Adamec

Awards and nominations

See also

 List of villains in Lois & Clark: The New Adventures of Superman

References

External links

Official Warner Bros. Site
Official DC Comics Site
First Person Account from Season One Supervising Producer

Lois & Clark: The New Adventures of Superman on SupermanHomepage.com

1990s American drama television series
1990s American romance television series
1993 American television series debuts
1997 American television series endings
American fantasy drama television series
American romantic drama television series
American action adventure television series
American fantasy television series
American superhero television series
Cultural depictions of H. G. Wells
Fictional couples
 
Television shows based on DC Comics
American Broadcasting Company original programming
English-language television shows
Saturn Award-winning television series
Superman television series
Television series by Warner Bros. Television Studios
Television shows set in the United States
Television shows adapted into novels